Behold the Man may refer to:

Ecce Homo, Latin words for Behold the Man, scourged Jesus Christ, bound and crowned with thorns, to a hostile crowd shortly before his Crucifixion
Behold the Man (novel), 1969 science fiction novel by Michael Moorcock
Behold the Man (album), 1981 album by the band Zion